Warberg is a municipality in the district of Helmstedt, in Lower Saxony, Germany.

References

Helmstedt (district)